The 1944 San Diego Naval Training Station Bluejackets football team was an American football team that represented San Diego Naval Training Station during the 1944 college football season.  The team was coached by Skip Stahley, former head coach at Brown, and played its home games on Hull Field in San Diego. The Bluejackets compiled a 4–3–1 record.

Key players included quarterback Clyde LeForce, formerly of Tulsa and later with the Detroit Lions, and end John Stonebraker, formerly of USC and the Green Bay Packers.

Schedule

References

 
San Diego Naval Training Station
San Diego Naval Training Station Bluejackets football